A regimental combat team (RCT) is a provisional major infantry unit which has seen use by branches of the United States Armed Forces.  It is formed by augmenting a regular infantry regiment with smaller combat, combat support and combat service support units.

The United States Army first adopted the RCT concept just prior to World War II, where it served as the infantry-centric counterpart to the Combat Command used by armored forces.  RCTs were widely used during World War II and the Korean War but were disbanded after the adoption of the Pentomic structure in 1957.

The United States Marine Corps maintains the use of the RCT to the present day.

U.S. Army

In 1939, the US Army formally switched from the square division to the triangular division, eliminating the brigade and leaving the regiment as the basic combat subunit of a division.  However, the Army also recognized that it would need a separate infantry force to conduct missions too small for a division and created the regimental combat team (RCT).  The 2nd Division, which was first to test the triangular division concept, initially referred to this type of formation as an "echelon" but as the term already had generally accepted military definitions the combat team term was officially adopted instead.

During World War II a typical RCT consisted of an infantry regiment, a field artillery battalion, a combat engineer company, a medical company, and a signals platoon.  However the organization could be tailored to fit its mission and might include additional units, such as a company from a separate tank battalion, a company from a tank destroyer battalion, and a battery from an anti-aircraft artillery battalion.  Usually the RCT was led by the commanding officer of the infantry regiment (Colonel) but on occasion a brigadier general was sent to command it.  Most infantry regiments not part of a division were organized as RCTs, but by the end of the war most infantry divisions were also organizing their regiments as RCTs.

The concept was retained after the end of World War II and RCTs were issued their own shoulder patches.  RCTs were used extensively during the Korean War, with the 187th Airborne Regimental Combat Team illustrating the typical organization of an RCT from this era.  The RCT was retained until 1957 when the Army was reorganized under the Pentomic structure, under which both regiments and battalions were eliminated as tactical units and replaced with battle groups.

U.S. Marine Corps

The U.S. Marine Corps has retained the regiment as a basic unit smaller than a division but larger than a battalion, and it continues to employ reinforced regiments as RCTs in Iraq and Afghanistan.

Under current US Marine Corps doctrine, a Marine Division typically contains three organic Marine infantry regiments. Whenever a Marine Expeditionary Brigade (MEB) is formed within its parent Marine Expeditionary Force (MEF), one of the division's infantry regiments is designated as the base of the regimental combat team (RCT) and serves as the ground combat element (GCE) of the MEB.

The regiment, commanded by a colonel, consists of a Headquarters Company and three identical Marine infantry battalions. The regiment is then heavily reinforced by other division assets to form the RCT.

These reinforcements typically include:
 One artillery battalion (drawn from the division's organic artillery regiment), consisting of a headquarters battery and four identical firing batteries, each containing six 155 mm towed howitzers;
 An armored vehicle battalion equivalent, consisting of an assault amphibian company (reinforced) (48 amphibious assault vehicles), a light armored reconnaissance company (reinforced) (27 light armored vehicles) and a tank company (reinforced) (14 main battle tanks), each drawn from their parent division's organic type battalion;
 A combat support battalion equivalent, consisting of a combat engineer company, a reconnaissance company (each drawn from their parent division's organic type battalion), and a support company, formed from the parent division's headquarters battalion, consisting of platoons from the headquarters, communications, and truck companies.
 The RCT receives dedicated logistical support from a combat logistics battalion, which is organic to the combat logistics regiment of the MEB.

Therefore, the RCT is roughly the same size (approximately 4,500–5,000 Marines and Sailors) and has generally the same number of battalions (and battalion equivalents) as a US Army brigade combat team (BCT). However, the RCT as the ground combat element (GCE) of a MEB, is combined with a regimental equivalent Marine aircraft group (itself equivalent to a US Army combat aviation brigade) as the air combat element (ACE), a battalion-sized command element (CE), and the aforementioned combat logistics regiment as the (LCE) to complete the organizational structure of the MEB.

See also
 Brigade combat team

References 

Military units and formations by size
Regiments of the United States Army
Regiments of the United States Marine Corps